Daniel Maric (born 11 June 1957) is a French former professional ice hockey goaltender. He competed in the men's tournament at the 1988 Winter Olympics.

References

External links

1957 births
Living people
French ice hockey goaltenders
Olympic ice hockey players of France
Ice hockey players at the 1988 Winter Olympics
Sportspeople from Grenoble
Brûleurs de Loups players
Ours de Villard-de-Lans players